Suzuna may refer to:
Suzuna Hīragi, a fictional character of Dog & Scissors.
Suzuna Kuraki, a fictional character of Moonlight Lady.
Suzuna Taki, a fictional character of Eyeshield 21.